Streptomyces pharetrae is a bacterium species from the genus of Streptomyces which has been isolated from soil from the Western Cape Province in South Africa.

See also 
 List of Streptomyces species

References

Further reading

External links
Type strain of Streptomyces pharetrae at BacDive -  the Bacterial Diversity Metadatabase	

pharetrae
Bacteria described in 2005